Crystal Falls  may refer to:

Places in Brazil
 Crystal Falls (Brazil)

Places in Canada
 Crystal Falls, Ontario, a community in West Nipissing
 Crystal Falls, Quebec

Places in the United States
 Crystal Falls, Michigan
 Crystal Falls Township, Michigan
 Crystal Falls, Wyoming